Peter Marinus Nieuwenhuis (born 3 April 1951) is a Dutch retired cyclist who was active between 1970 and 1976. He competed at the 1976 Summer Olympics in the 4 km team pursuit and finished in fifth place. He won a bronze medal in this event at the 1973 World Championships.

His wife, Minie Brinkhoff, was also a top-level cyclist.

See also
 List of Dutch Olympic cyclists

References

1951 births
Living people
Olympic cyclists of the Netherlands
Cyclists at the 1976 Summer Olympics
Dutch male cyclists
Cyclists from Amsterdam